Tim Elston is an Australian actor.

He was known for his acting roles on television as Detective Mitchell in Bellamy, Doctor Scott Collins in Prisoner and police sergeant Warren Bryant in Richmond Hill.

External links

Australian male television actors
Living people
Year of birth missing (living people)
Place of birth missing (living people)
20th-century Australian male actors